In mathematics,  Danzer's configuration is a self-dual configuration of 35 lines and 35 points, having 4 points on each line and 4 lines through each point. It is named after the German geometer Ludwig Danzer and was popularised by Branko Grünbaum. The Levi graph of the configuration is the Kronecker cover of the odd graph O4, and is isomorphic to the middle layer graph of the seven-dimensional hypercube graph Q7. The middle layer graph of an odd-dimensional hypercube graph Q2n+1(n,n+1) is a subgraph whose vertex set consists of all binary strings of length 2n + 1 that have exactly n or n + 1 entries equal to 1, with an edge between any two vertices for which the corresponding binary strings differ in exactly one bit. Every middle layer graph is Hamiltonian.

Danzer's configuration DCD(4) is the fourth term of an infinite series of  configurations DCD(n), where DCD(1) is the trivial configuration (11), DCD(2) is the trilateral (32) and DCD(3) is the Desargues configuration (103). In  configurations DCD(n) were further generalized to the unbalanced  configuration DCD(n,d) by introducing parameter d with connection DCD(n) = DCD(2n-1,n). DCD stands for Desargues-Cayley-Danzer. Each DCD(2n,d) configuration is a subconfiguration of
the  Clifford configuration. While each DCD(n,d) admits a realisation as a geometric point-line configuration, the Clifford configuration can only be realised as a point-circle configuration
and depicts the Clifford's circle theorems.

Example

See also

Miquel configuration
Reye configuration

References

Bibliography
.
.
.
.

Configurations (geometry)